Randy Meisner is an American musician and songwriter. It is also the title of two eponymous albums:

 Randy Meisner (1978 album)
 Randy Meisner (1982 album)